"Angel Trip" is the sixth single by Vamps, released on June 9, 2010. The B-side is a cover, with some lyrics changed, of "Satsugai", a song K.A.Z wrote for the Detroit Metal City live action film. The limited edition came with a DVD that includes the music video for the title track and its making of. The single reached number 4 on the Oricon chart.

Track listing

References 

2010 singles
Japanese rock songs
Songs written by Hyde (musician)
2010 songs